Kawau or Te Kawau may refer to:

Kawau Island, in the Hauraki Gulf, off the north-eastern coast of the North Island of New Zealand
Kawau, the  Māori name for the Great cormorant
Te Kawau, a New Zealand rugby club 
Jason Kawau (born 1981), a New Zealand rugby player
Āpihai Te Kawau (died 1869), a paramount chief of the Ngāti Whātua Māori tribe

See also

Kawaue, Gifu, Japan